Herder is a German surname. Notable people with the surname include:

 Andrzej Herder (1937–2002), Polish actor
 August Herder (1776-.1838), German mineralogist and geologist
 Bartholomäus Herder (1774–1839), German publisher, founder of Verlag Herder
 Benjamin Herder (1818–1888), German publisher, son of Bartholomäus
 Johann Gottfried Herder (1744–1803), German literary scholar and philosopher after whom the Herder Prize is named
 Karl Raphael Herder (1816–1865), German publisher, son of Bartholomäus
 Karoline Herder (1750–1809), German biographer of Johann Gottfried Herder
 William James Herder (1849–1922), Newfoundlander newspaper publisher, one of those commemorated in the Herder Memorial Trophy for ice-hockey

German-language surnames